Đỗ Thị Ánh Nguyệt (born 15 January 2001) is a Vietnamese archer. She competed in the women's individual event at the 2020 Summer Olympics. She was born in Văn Lâm, Hưng Yên.

References

External links
 

2001 births
Living people
Vietnamese female archers
Olympic archers of Vietnam
Archers at the 2020 Summer Olympics
People from Hưng Yên Province
21st-century Vietnamese women
Competitors at the 2021 Southeast Asian Games
Southeast Asian Games silver medalists for Vietnam
Southeast Asian Games bronze medalists for Vietnam
Southeast Asian Games medalists in archery